Mortsel-Liersesteenweg is a railway station in Mortsel, just south of the city of Antwerp, Antwerp, Belgium. The station opened in 1933 as Mortsel-Oude-God on Line 27. The station closed in 1939 and re-opened in December 2008.

History
Due to protests from residents and businesses, the station Mortsel-Oude-God was moved onto Line 25 in 1939. The station was renamed Mortsel-Liersesteenweg and was closed in 1939. In 2008 the station was re-opened for regular use.

Train services
The station is served by the following services:

Brussels RER services (S1) Antwerp - Mechelen - Brussels - Waterloo - Nivelles (weekdays)

External links
Belgian Railways website
De Lijn website

Railway stations opened in 1933
Railway stations in Belgium
Railway stations in Antwerp Province
Mortsel